The 2014–15 Clemson Tigers men's basketball team represented Clemson University during the 2014–15 NCAA Division I men's basketball season. Led by fifth year head coach Brad Brownell, the Tigers played their home games at Littlejohn Coliseum as members of the Atlantic Coast Conference. They finished the season 16–15, 8–10 in ACC play to finish in a three way tie for sixth place. They lost in the second round of the ACC tournament to Florida State.

Last season
The Tigers finished the season 23–13, 10–8 in ACC play to finish in sixth place. They advanced to the quarterfinals of the ACC tournament where they lost to Duke. They received an invitation to the National Invitation Tournament where they defeated Georgia State, Illinois and Belmont to advance to the semifinals where they lost to SMU.

Departures

Recruiting class

Roster

Schedule

|-
!colspan=12 style="background:#522D80; color:#F66733;"| Exhibition

|-
!colspan=12 style="background:#522D80; color:#F66733;"| Non-conference regular season

|-
!colspan=12 style="background:#522D80; color:#F66733;"| ACC regular season

|-
!colspan=12 style="background:#522D80;"| ACC tournament

Clemson Tigers men's basketball seasons
Clemson